Eliot Callis (born 8 November 1994, in Doncaster) is a Northern first-class cricketer active since 2014 who plays for Yorkshire. He is a right-handed batsman and a right-arm leg break bowler. He played for Bedfordshire in the 2016 Minor Counties Championship. Callis toured Australia in 2017/18 to play for Kyabram cricket club who at the time were leading the club championship. Since returning from Australia and joining High Wycombe Cricket Club, Callis has become a formidable in the Home Counties Premier League finishing the 2021 season as top run scorer, contributing heavily towards HWCC's first title win since 2015. Since his professional career came to a close, Eliot began Co-hosting a podcast named 'Caught In the deep' at his club side High Wycombe Cricket Club.

References

Living people
1994 births
English cricketers
Yorkshire cricketers
Bedfordshire cricketers
Cricketers from Doncaster
English cricketers of the 21st century